Jarl Sune Malmström (28 October 1897 – 17 December 1961) was a Swedish male tennis player who represented Sweden in the Davis Cup and the Olympic Games.

Tennis career
Malmström competed in the singles, doubles and mixed doubles events at the 1920 Summer Olympics. In the singles event he reached the quarterfinal after a bye in the first round and wins against Ladislav Žemla and Charles Simon. In the quarterfinal he was defeated by South African Louis Raymond. With compatriot Carl-Erik von Braun he lost in the first round of the doubles event against Jean Washer and Albert Lammens. In the mixed doubles event he teamed up with Lily Strömberg and after byes in the first and second round they lost the quarterfinal match against the Danish team Amory Hansen and Erik Tegner in three sets.

Malmström participated in the 1920 Wimbledon Championships, playing in the singles and doubles events. In the singles he made it to the second round after a victory in the first round against Beverley Covell. In the second round he lost in straight sets to Augustos Zerlendis. With countryman Carl-Erik von Braun he reached the third round of the doubles event in which Algernon Kingscote and James Cecil Parke proved too strong.

See also
List of Sweden Davis Cup team representatives

References

External links

1897 births
1961 deaths
Swedish male tennis players
Olympic tennis players of Sweden
Tennis players at the 1920 Summer Olympics
Sportspeople from Malmö